Jake Moreland (born January 18, 1977) is a former player in the National Football League for the New York Jets and Cleveland Browns in 2000 and 2001. Moreland currently serves as the tight ends coach for the Houston Texans. He has coached previously at Syracuse, Air Force and Western Michigan.

Biography
Moreland was born on January 18, 1977, in Milwaukee, Wisconsin. Moreland went on to play two seasons in the NFL for the New York Jets (2000) and Cleveland Browns (2001), catching three passes for 15 yards. Moreland retired in 2002 shortly after signing with the Houston Texans. Then started his coaching career by taking the Tight End position at Elmhurst College, then Special Teams Coordinator at Saint Joseph's College, then went to Western Michigan.

References

New York Jets players
New York Jets coaches
Cleveland Browns players
Western Michigan Broncos football players
Western Michigan Broncos football coaches
Sportspeople from Milwaukee
Players of American football from Milwaukee
1977 births
Living people
Elmhurst Bluejays football coaches
Saint Joseph's Pumas football coaches
Air Force Falcons football coaches
Syracuse Orange football coaches
American football tight ends
Marquette University High School alumni
Denver Broncos coaches